Liz Rijsbergen (born 14 February 2002) is a Dutch footballer who plays as a midfielder for ADO Den Haag in the Eredivisie.

References

Living people
Dutch women's footballers
Eredivisie (women) players
2002 births
Women's association football midfielders
ADO Den Haag (women) players
People from Leiderdorp
Footballers from South Holland